Earl Frederick Hilliard (born April 9, 1942) is an American politician from the U.S. state of Alabama who served as the U.S. representative for the state's 7th district.

Life and career
Hilliard was born in Birmingham, Alabama, and graduated from Morehouse College. He was elected as a  Democrat to the Alabama House of Representatives in 1974 and served from 1975 until 1981 and in the Alabama Senate from 1981 until 1992. Hilliard was elected to the United States House of Representatives in 1992 from the 7th District, a 65 percent black-majority district stretching from Birmingham to Montgomery. In the process, he became the first Black person since Jeramiah Haralson in 1877 to represent Alabama in Congress. He also became the first Democrat to represent a significant portion of the capital since 1965.

He faced his first serious challenge from Artur Davis in the 2000 Democratic primary election—the real contest in this heavily Democratic district—but prevailed.

Davis challenged Hilliard again in 2002 in a district that had been changed significantly by redistricting. The 7th lost its share of Montgomery, and was pushed further into Birmingham, absorbing a large number of mostly white precincts in that city. The campaign that year was focused on Hilliard's record in office and alleged ethical issues, as well as race, the Israeli–Palestinian conflict, and terrorism. Hilliard claimed "the only thing" that Davis, also an African American, had done for African Americans was "put them in jail" during his time as a federal prosecutor. In 2001, Hilliard voted against a bill funding increases in military support to Israel and opposing criminalization of Palestinian politicians. Because a third candidate also ran in the Democratic primary, Hilliard finished with the most votes but failed to win a majority; under Alabama law, he then faced a rematch with second-place finisher Davis in a run-off election. Davis won the run-off with 54% of the vote.

Hilliard is a 1960 graduate of Western-Olin High School in Birmingham. He received a B.A. in 1964 from Morehouse College, a J.D. in 1967 from Howard University, and an M.B.A. in 1970 from Atlanta University.

He is a member of Alpha Phi Alpha fraternity. He is a member of the board of the Congressional Black Caucus Institute.

Hilliard's son, Earl Hilliard, Jr., is a former member of the Alabama House of Representatives who ran unsuccessfully for Congress in 2010, also in the 7th district.

See also
List of African-American United States representatives

References

External links

 "The Israel Lobby" interview of Hilliard describes how he was demonized in the media for opposing pro-Israel legislation
 

1942 births
Living people
African-American members of the United States House of Representatives
African-American state legislators in Alabama
Democratic Party Alabama state senators
Alabama lawyers
Clark Atlanta University alumni
Howard University School of Law alumni
Democratic Party members of the Alabama House of Representatives
Morehouse College alumni
Politicians from Birmingham, Alabama
Democratic Party members of the United States House of Representatives from Alabama
21st-century American politicians
21st-century African-American politicians
20th-century African-American people